David Robbins may refer to:

 David B. Robbins (born 1959), American investor
 Dave Robbins (trombonist) (1923–2005), American-Canadian trombonist, composer, and teacher
 Dave Robbins (basketball) (born 1942), American basketball coach
 David P. Robbins (1942–2003), American mathematician
 David L. Robbins (Oregon writer) (born 1950), American fiction and non-fiction writer
 David L. Robbins (Virginia writer) (born 1954), American writer of historical fiction
 David Robbins (composer) (born 1955), American composer of film soundtracks
 David Robbins (artist) (born 1957), American artist and writer